Cordulecerus is a genus of owlflies, neuropteran insects in the subfamily Ascalaphinae. Species are found in Central and South America.

Species
The ten species in this genus include:

 Cordulecerus alopecinus (Burmeister, 1839)
 Cordulecerus dohrni van der Weele, 1909
 Cordulecerus elegans van der Weele, 1909
 Cordulecerus inquinatus Gerstaecker, 1888
 Cordulecerus maclachlani Sélys-Lonchamps, 1871
 Cordulecerus mexicanus van der Weele, 1909
 Cordulecerus praecellens (Gerstaecker, 1885)
 Cordulecerus subiratus (Walker, 1853)
 Cordulecerus subiratus meridionalis van der Weele, 1909
 Cordulecerus subiratus subiratus (Walker, 1853)
 Cordulecerus surinamensis  (Fabricius, 1798)
 Cordulecerus unicus  (Walker, 1860)

References

External links 
 Cordulecerus at insectoid.info

Myrmeleontidae
Neuroptera genera